Kamen Rider Ghost is a 2015-2016 Japanese television series, the 26th entry of the long-running Kamen Rider Series, and 17th in the Heisei era run of the show. The series is directed by Satoshi Morota and written by Takuro Fukuda. It premiered on TV Asahi on October 4, 2015.

The series' opening theme is  performed by the Japanese rock band Kishidan.

Much like some of Gaim's earlier episodes, the episode titles for this season are all in the form of a exclamatory sentences, with the first one being exactly two kanji long much like Kuuga's episodes.



Episodes

References

External links
 for TV Asahi
 for Toei Company

Ghost episodes

Episodes